Holy Trinity Church, Winchester is a Church of England parish church in Winchester, England.

History
Holy Trinity is a Commissioners' church, one of many built with money voted by Parliament as a result of the Church Building Acts of 1818 and 1824. The Second Parliamentary Grant, provided by the Church Building Act 1824, gave £300 towards the building of Holy Trinity Church.
 
On 14 January 1974, the church was designated a grade II* listed building.

Present day
Holy Trinity Church stands in the Catholic tradition of the Church of England. The parish has passed resolutions to reject the ordination of women, and is a member of Forward in Faith and The Society. The parish receives alternative episcopal oversight from the Bishop of Richborough (currently Norman Banks).

References

External links

Church of England church buildings in Hampshire
Commissioners' church buildings
19th-century Church of England church buildings
Holy Trinity
Grade II* listed churches in Hampshire
Anglo-Catholic churches in England receiving AEO
Anglo-Catholic church buildings in Hampshire